Steve Robinson (born 4 March 1965) is an Australian former rugby league footballer who played in the 1980s and 1990s.

Career

Australia
Robinson was from Penrith, New South Wales, and played 38 games in three seasons with the Penrith Panthers between 1983 and 1985, before moving to the St George Dragons for five seasons between 1986 and 1990.

Robinson was a member of St. George Dragons team that won the 1988 Panasonic Cup, scoring a try in the Cup Final.

He finished his Australian career at Eastern Suburbs for two seasons between 1991 and 1992.

England
He also featured with several English clubs between 1983 and 1993 including Castleford Tigers (Heritage № 629), Halifax, Hull Kingston Rovers and Scarborough Pirates.

Representative career
In 1988, Robinson was selected on the bench for a President's XIII that played the touring Great Britain Lions at the Seiffert Oval in Canberra. In wet and muddy conditions, the President's XIII defeated the tourists 24–16.

References

1965 births
Living people
Australian rugby league players
Castleford Tigers players
Halifax R.L.F.C. players
Hull Kingston Rovers players
Penrith Panthers players
Rugby league five-eighths
Rugby league players from Penrith, New South Wales
Scarborough Pirates players
St. George Dragons players
Sydney Roosters players